Norges-Nytt was a Norwegian magazine issued in Stockholm from September 1941 by the Press Office of the Norwegian legation in Stockholm. It had a circulation of up to 40,000 copies.

Among the editors of Norges-Nytt were journalists Jørgen Juve (until 1942) and Rolf Gerhardsen. The last issue was #24 published in 1945.

See also
Håndslag

References

External links
 WorldCat record

1941 establishments in Sweden
1945 disestablishments in Sweden
Defunct magazines published in Sweden
Magazines established in 1941
Magazines disestablished in 1945
Magazines published in Stockholm
Norway in World War II
Norwegian-language magazines
Sweden in World War II